Dichlorochromopyrrolate synthase (RebD, dichlorochromopyrrolic acid synthase) is an enzyme with systematic name 2-imino-3-(7-chloroindol-3-yl)propanoate ammonia-lyase (dichlorochromopyrrolate-forming). This enzyme catalyses the following chemical reaction

 4 2-imino-3-(7-chloroindol-3-yl)propanoate + O2  2 dichlorochromopyrrolate + 2 NH3 + 2 H2O

This enzyme catalyses a step in the biosynthesis of rebeccamycin.

References

External links 
 

EC 1.21.3